Alen Stanešić (born March 25, 1983) is a Croatian retired football player.

Career
Stanešić started his career at Hrvatski Dragovoljac in 2002. In 2003, he moved to Japanese J1 League club, Cerezo Osaka on loan. In summer 2003, he returned to Hrvatski Dragovoljac.

References

External links
Cerezo Osaka
ALEN STANESIC,Player's Data,Match Statistical Information,7M Sports

1983 births
Living people
Association football midfielders
Croatian footballers
NK Hrvatski Dragovoljac players
Cerezo Osaka players
J1 League players
Croatian expatriate footballers
Expatriate footballers in Japan
Croatian expatriate sportspeople in Japan